Max Jørgensen (9 April 1923 – 26 November 1992) was a Danish cyclist. He competed in the team pursuit event at the 1948 Summer Olympics.

References

External links
 

1923 births
1992 deaths
People from Greve Municipality
Danish male cyclists
Olympic cyclists of Denmark
Cyclists at the 1948 Summer Olympics
Sportspeople from Region Zealand